Nina Totenberg (born January 14, 1944) is an American legal affairs correspondent for National Public Radio (NPR) focusing primarily on the activities and politics of the Supreme Court of the United States. Her reports air regularly on NPR's news magazines All Things Considered, Morning Edition, and Weekend Edition. From 1992 to 2013, she was also a panelist on the syndicated TV political commentary show Inside Washington.

She's considered one of NPR's "Founding Mothers" along with Susan Stamberg, Linda Wertheimer and the late Cokie Roberts. Newsweek magazine called her "the creme de la creme" of NPR, and Vanity Fair refers to her as "Queen of the Leaks". She has won many broadcast journalism awards for both her explanatory pieces and her scoops.

Among her scoops was her groundbreaking report of sexual harassment allegations made against Clarence Thomas by University of Oklahoma law professor Anita Hill, leading the Senate Judiciary Committee to re-open Thomas's Supreme Court confirmation hearings. Previously, in 1986, she broke the story that Supreme Court nominee Douglas H. Ginsburg had smoked marijuana, leading Ginsburg to withdraw his name. In 1977, she reported on secret Supreme Court deliberations relating to the Watergate scandal.

Personal life and family

Totenberg was born in Manhattan, New York, the eldest daughter of Melanie Francis (Eisenberg), a real estate broker, and violinist Roman Totenberg. Her father was a Polish Jewish immigrant, who lost many of his family members in the Holocaust. Her mother was of German Jewish and Polish Jewish descent, from an upper-class family that had lived in San Francisco and New York. She is the widow of U.S. Senator Floyd K. Haskell (D-Colorado), whom she married in 1979. She remarried in 2000 to H. David Reines, a trauma surgeon and Vice Chairman of Surgery at Inova Fairfax Hospital. Justice Ruth Bader Ginsburg presided over this wedding. On their honeymoon, he treated her for severe injuries after she was struck by a boat propeller while swimming. In March 2010, Totenberg's sister Amy Totenberg was nominated by President Barack Obama to the U.S. District Court in Atlanta. Amy Totenberg was confirmed the next year. Another sister, Jill Totenberg, is a businesswoman married to Brian Foreman. On August 6, 2015, the Ames Stradivarius, which had been stolen from their father 35 years earlier, was returned to the three sisters.

Early career
Totenberg enrolled in Boston University in 1962, majoring in journalism, but dropped out less than three years later because, in her own words, she "wasn’t doing brilliantly".  Soon after dropping out of college, Totenberg began her journalism career at the Boston Record American, where she worked on the Women's Page and learned breaking news journalism skills by volunteering in the news department.  She moved on to the Peabody Times in Massachusetts and Roll Call in Washington, D.C.

At the National Observer, Totenberg began covering legal affairs.  In 1971 she broke a story about a secret list of candidates President Richard Nixon was considering for the Supreme Court.  All the candidates were later rejected as unqualified by the American Bar Association and none were nominated.

After Totenberg wrote an Observer profile of FBI director J. Edgar Hoover, the latter wrote a long letter to the paper's editor demanding she be fired.  Instead, the editor printed the letter in the Observer along with a rebuttal of Hoover's complaints regarding the article.

She was fired from that paper for plagiarism in 1972 regarding a profile she wrote of then-soon-to-be Speaker Tip O'Neill which included, without attribution, quotes from members of Congress that had previously appeared in The Washington Post.  Totenberg has said that the dismissal also related to her rebuffing of sexual overtures from an editor.  Many of Totenberg's colleagues have defended her, noting that the use of previously-reported quotes was a common journalistic practice in the 1970s.  In 1995, Totenberg told the Columbia Journalism Review, "I have a strong feeling that a young reporter is entitled to one mistake and to have the holy bejeezus scared out of her to never do it again."

She next worked for the New York-based news magazine New Times.  At that publication, she wrote a celebrated article called "The Ten Dumbest Members of Congress", prompting the senator at the top of the list, William L. Scott, to call a press conference to deny that he was the "dumbest member of Congress."

National Public Radio
In 1975, Nina Totenberg was hired by Bob Zelnick to work at National Public Radio and has been there since.

Watergate appeals
In 1977, Totenberg broke a story about the Supreme Court appeal of three men who had been convicted in the Watergate scandal: H.R. Haldeman, John N. Mitchell, and John D. Ehrlichman.  Totenberg revealed the results of their secret 5–3 vote against reviewing the case and that the three dissenters were appointees of President Richard Nixon. Nixon had resigned three years earlier, in the wake of Watergate.  Totenberg also revealed that Nixon-appointed Chief Justice Warren Burger delayed announcing the results of the vote, hoping to sway his fellow justices. Her reporting of private Supreme Court deliberations was a novel development in Supreme Court reporting and led to speculation about who on the Court gave her the information.

William Rehnquist's Chief Justice nomination
In 1986, Totenberg broke the story that William H. Rehnquist, who was nominated for Chief Justice of the United States by Ronald Reagan, had written a memo in 1970 opposing the Equal Rights Amendment, in which he said that the amendment would "hasten the dissolution of the family" and that would "virtually abolish all legal distinctions between men and women."  The memo was written when Rehnquist was head of the Justice Department's Office of Legal Counsel in the Nixon Administration.

Douglas Ginsburg's Supreme Court nomination
Totenberg broke the story that Judge Douglas H. Ginsburg, who had been nominated to the Supreme Court by Ronald Reagan, had smoked marijuana "on a few occasions" during his student days in the 1960s and while an assistant professor at Harvard Law School in the 1970s, something that did not appear in Ginsburg's FBI background check. The revelations resulted in Ginsburg's withdrawing his name from consideration.  Totenberg was awarded the 1988 Alfred I. duPont-Columbia University Silver Baton award for outstanding broadcast journalism for the story.

Clarence Thomas/Anita Hill hearings

In 1991, a few days before a confirmation vote was scheduled for Republican George H. W. Bush's Supreme Court nominee Clarence Thomas, Totenberg disclosed allegations of sexual harassment lodged against Thomas by University of Oklahoma law professor Anita Hill. Totenberg's report about Hill's allegations led the Senate Judiciary Committee to re-open Thomas's Supreme Court confirmation hearings to consider Hill's charges.

Totenberg was criticized by many of Thomas' supporters, including Republican senators on the Judiciary Committee.  The Senate appointed special counsel Peter E. Fleming Jr. to investigate the leak. Totenberg and Newsdays Timothy Phelps were subpoenaed by Fleming, but refused to answer questions about their confidential sources.

Totenberg was confronted by one Thomas supporter, Republican Senator Alan K. Simpson, during and after the taping of an episode of Nightline.  On the show, Simpson criticized Totenberg, saying "What politicians get tired of is bias in reporters. Let's not pretend your reporting is objective here.  That would be absurd."  After Totenberg defended her reporting and objectivity on the show, Simpson followed her out of the studio and continued to criticize her, even holding open the door of her limousine so she could not leave. "He was in a complete rage. He was out of control," Totenberg said.  Accounts differ on Totenberg's response, but she used what she called "choice epithets" and said: "I think I told him to shut the fuck up."

Following Totenberg's allegation to The Washington Posts Howard Kurtz that she had been sexually harassed at the National Observer, Al Hunt of The Wall Street Journal brought up the plagiarism incident in a column about media coverage of and responses to the Thomas hearings.  Some observers connected Hunt's rehashing of a then nearly 20-year-old incident to the stance of the Journal, whose conservative editorial pages had "editorially championed" Thomas and had previously criticized Totenberg, but Hunt denied any ideological motivation.

For the report and NPR's gavel-to-gavel coverage, Totenberg received the George Foster Peabody Award. The same year, she won the George Polk Award for excellence in journalism and the Joan S. Barone Award for excellence in Washington-based national affairs/public policy reporting (the latter also in part for her coverage of the retirement of Justice Thurgood Marshall). The American Library Association presented her with its James Madison Award, given to those who "championed, protected, and promoted public access to government information and the public’s right to know".  She also earned the Sigma Delta Chi Award from the Society of Professional Journalists for investigative reporting.

Distinction and acclaim

In addition to awards mentioned above, and among her other awards, Totenberg has been honored seven times by the American Bar Association for excellence in legal reporting and won the first-ever Toni House award presented by the American Judicature Society for a career body of work, and was the first radio journalist to be honored by the National Press Foundation as Broadcaster of the Year. She has written articles for the Harvard Law Review (including tributes to Justices William J. Brennan, Jr. and Lewis Powell when they retired); The New York Times Magazine, New York magazine; the Christian Science Monitor; and numerous other legal and general circulation publications. She also contributed to the Jewish Women's Archive's online exhibit Jewish Women and the Feminist Revolution with regard to her reporting on Anita Hill's allegations against Clarence Thomas. In the 1990s Totenberg was a regular contributor to ABC's Nightline.

Totenberg played the part of an election anchor in the film The Distinguished Gentleman (1992), and also appeared briefly as herself in the Kevin Kline film Dave (1993). Her image has also been used for an item produced for NPR called "The Nina Totin' Bag"—a play on her name and the stereotypical tote bag offered as a thank-you gift for donating to a public broadcasting pledge drive.

Controversies and criticism

Allegations of partisanship 
Totenberg has made friends with a number of politicians and lawyers in national politics, and her personal connections to these people have occasionally generated discussion. Allegations that Totenberg obtained her scoops by untoward means were prevalent early in her career, a fact Bill Kovach, editor of The New York Times, attributed to sexism since she was one of the few women working in a predominantly male environment. Totenberg was criticized by some commentators for hugging her friend Lani Guinier during a press conference announcing Guinier's nomination by Bill Clinton to the post of Assistant Attorney General for Civil Rights.  Media critic Howard Kurtz reported that while Totenberg said she did not intend to give special treatment to Guinier in her reporting, she had hugged her because she had not seen her in some time. Then in 2000, some journalists expressed concern that Justice Ruth Bader Ginsburg's officiating at Totenberg's wedding could be seen as a conflict of interest. Totenberg responded she did not consider it a conflict of interest since her friendship with the jurist was established long before Ginsburg was nominated to the Supreme Court. She also had a friendship with Justice Antonin Scalia from when he was an assistant US attorney general.

The Wall Street Journal editorialist Paul Gigot wrote in 1991 that Totenberg exhibits partisanship in her reporting.  Washington Post reporter Thomas Edsall said in 1995 that she was cited as an example of liberal bias in public broadcasting due to her reporting on two controversial Supreme Court nominations.

AIDs comment 
In 1995, responding to conservative Senator Jesse Helms (R-N.C.), who characterized AIDS as a "disease transmitted by people deliberately engaging in unnatural acts" in his effort to cut government spending to combat it, Totenberg said: "I think he ought to be worried about what's going on in the good Lord's mind, because if there's retributive justice, he'll get AIDS from a transfusion or one of his grandchildren will." On the same show, conservative columnists Charles Krauthammer and Tony Snow also criticized Helms, with Krauthammer calling Helms's remarks "bigoted and cruel" and Snow accusing him of "hypocrisy". Totenberg subsequently expressed regret for her choice of words, saying: "It was a stupid remark. I'll pay for it for the rest of my life." Following his October 2010 firing from NPR for comments he made on FoxNews, Juan Williams said the failure of NPR to discipline her for these statements was an example of NPR's double standard, a charge echoed by Fox News and conservative pundits.

Relationship with RBG 
In 2020, just after the death of Supreme Court Justice Ruth Bader Ginsburg, Totenberg disclosed a 48-year-long friendship she had with Ginsburg in an obituary for the Justice. Although it was known that the two were cordial, the deeply personal nature of their friendship was not widely known until Totenberg released the obituary. Subsequently, Totenberg received criticism for not disclosing the friendship. NPR's Public editor released an editorial on the topic, calling Totenberg's undisclosed friendship with Ginsburg a conflict of interest (given Totenberg's role as Legal Affairs correspondent) and stating that it implies that there is "one set of standards for senior, elite journalists, and another set of standards for the rest of the staff".

COVID-19 coverage 
In January 2022, Totenberg received criticism for her reporting on the impact of COVID-19 pandemic related mask-wearing at the Supreme Court. On January 18, 2022, an article by Totenberg claimed that Chief Justice John Roberts "in some form" asked that the justices wear masks during oral arguments, partially due to Justice Sonia Sotomayor's diabetes-related health concerns. Totenberg reported that Justice Neil Gorsuch (the Justice who sits next to Sotomayor on the bench) was the only Justice who refused to wear a mask, forcing Justice Sotomayor to join oral arguments virtually despite the other eight justices hearing oral arguments in person. A day after Totenberg's piece, Justices Gorsuch and Sotomayor issued a rare joint statement stating that Totenberg's story "surprised us"  and Chief Justice Roberts issued a statement denying he had asked any Justices to wear a mask. Totenberg stood by her claim, citing that she did not know exactly how the Chief Justice asked the other justices to mask-up, but he did suggest "in some form" that they should wear masks. In response, NPR's public editor called for Totenberg to issue a clarification, saying that Totenberg should have been more careful in her choice of the word "asked", and that other words would have better described to the audience the subtlety with which executive messages are conveyed in the Supreme Court. The original article by Totenberg was updated on January 22 to reflect the clarification.

Publications

References

External links

 Nina Totenberg: Queen of the Leaks 
 

1944 births
Living people
American people of Polish-Jewish descent
American political journalists
American radio reporters and correspondents
American women radio journalists
Jewish American journalists
NBC News people
NPR personalities
Women's page journalists
People from Scarsdale, New York
People involved in plagiarism controversies
Boston University College of Communication alumni
Scarsdale High School alumni
21st-century American women
Totenberg family